Roberto Casas (born April 25, 1931) is a Cuban-born American former politician in the U.S. state of Florida.

He served in the Florida House of Representatives for the 111th district from 1982 to 1988, as a Republican. He also served in the Florida State Senate from 1988 to 2000.

References

1931 births
American politicians of Cuban descent
Living people
Hispanic and Latino American state legislators in Florida
People from Havana
People from Hialeah, Florida
Republican Party Florida state senators
Republican Party members of the Florida House of Representatives